Leya Garifullina (born 5 November 2004) is a Russian chess player. She was awarded the title of Woman Grandmaster (WGM) in 2020.

Chess career

She won the Girls Under-16 World Championship in 2019 in Bombay with 8.5 points out of 11. She tied for third in the Russian Women's Chess championship in December 2020.

She qualified for the Women's Chess World Cup 2021, where, ranked 44th, she beat Zenia Corrales Jiménez in the first round, before upsetting Olga Girya in the second round.

References

External links

Leya Garifullina chess games at 365Chess.com

2004 births
Living people
Russian female chess players
Chess woman grandmasters